The 2023 Virginia Senate election is scheduled to be held on Tuesday, November 7, 2023, concurrently with elections for the Virginia House of Delegates, to elect senators to all 40 seats in the Senate of Virginia for the 163rd and 164th Virginia Assembly. Nomination primaries held through the Department of Elections are to be held June 20, 2023. These will be the first elections held following redistricting as a result of the 2020 census.

Background 
Following the 2019 election, the Democratic Party gained 2 seats in the Senate, and gained control of both chambers of the General Assembly, marking the first time that Democrats held a government trifecta in Virginia since 1993. This was short-lived, however, as Republicans regained the governorship and the House of Delegates in the 2021 elections.

Retirements
Nine incumbents will not seek re-election.

Republicans
District 8: Steve Newman will retire.
District 19: John Cosgrove will retire.
District 26: Tommy Norment will retire.
District 31: Jill Vogel will retire.

Democrats
District 4: John Edwards will retire.
District 20: Lynwood Lewis will retire.
District 32: John Bell will retire.
District 35: Dick Saslaw will retire.
District 38: Janet Howell will retire.

Special elections
There was one special election for the 161st Virginia General Assembly held on March 23, 2021

District 38
Incumbent Republican Ben Chafin, first elected in 2014, died on January 1, 2021.

There was one special election for the 162nd Virginia General Assembly held on January 10, 2023

District 7
Incumbent Republican Jen Kiggans, first elected in 2019, resigned on November 15, 2022, to take office as U.S. representative for Virginia's 2nd congressional district.

There will be one special election for the 162nd Virginia General Assembly held on March 28, 2023

District 9
Incumbent democrat Jennifer McClellan, first elected in 2017, resigned on March 7, 2023, to take office as U.S. representative for Virginia's 4th congressional district.

Overview

List of districts

District 1
Senate District 1 contains all of the city of Winchester, Clarke County, Frederick County, Shenandoah County, and Warren County. This is an open seat following redistricting.

Republican Primary

Declared
 Lance Allen, security company executive and candidate for Lieutenant Governor in 2021
 James Bergida, Christendom College professor
 Robert Hupman, farmer
 Dave LaRock, state delegate
 John Massoud, Strasburg town councilor and nominee for HD-48 in 1997
 Brandon Monk, Frederick County school board member

Potential
 Brad Pollack, Shenandoah County supervisor

Democratic Primary

Potential
 Emily Scott, labor union employee and nominee for HD-15 in 2021

District 2
Senate District 2 contains all of the city of Harrisonburg, Bath County, Highland County, Page County, and Rockingham County, as well as portions of Augusta County. This district has two incumbents following redistricting: Republicans Emmett Hanger, who was first elected in 1995, and Mark Obenshain, who was first elected in 2003.

Republican Primary

Declared
 Mark Obenshain, incumbent

Potential
 Emmett Hanger, incumbent

District 3
Senate District 3 contains all of the cities of Buena Vista, Covington, Lexington, Staunton, Waynesboro, Alleghany County, Botetourt County, Craig County, and Rockbridge County, as well as portions of Augusta County and Roanoke County. This is an open seat following redistricting.

Republican Primary

Declared
 Chris Head, state delegate

Democratic Primary

Potential
 Jade Harris, former vice mayor of Glasgow and nominee for HD-24 in the 2023 special election

District 4
Senate District 4 contains the entire cities of Roanoke and Salem, as well as portions of Roanoke County and Montgomery County. This district has two incumbents following redistricting: Democrat John Edwards, who was first elected in 1995, and Republican Dave Suetterlein, who was first elected in 2015.

Democratic Primary

Declined
 John Edwards, incumbent

Republican Primary

Potential
 Dave Suetterlein, incumbent

District 5
Senate District 5 contains all of the city of Radford, Bland County, Giles County, Pulaski County, Smyth County, and Tazewell County, as well as portions of Montgomery County and Wythe County. The incumbent is Republican Travis Hackworth, who was first elected in 2021.

Republican Primary

Potential
 Travis Hackworth, incumbent

District 6
Senate District 6 contains all of the cities of Bristol, Norton, Buchanan County, Dickenson County, Lee County, Russell County, Scott County, Washington County, and Wise County. The incumbent is Republican Todd Pillion, who was first elected in 2019.

Republican Primary

Potential
 Todd Pillion, incumbent

District 7
Senate District 7 contains the entire cities of Galax, Martinsville, Carroll County, Floyd County, Franklin County, Grayson County, Henry County, and Patrick County, as well as portions of Wythe County. The incumbent is Republican Bill Stanley, who was first elected in 2011.

Republican Primary

Potential
 Bill Stanley, incumbent

District 8
Senate District 8 contains the entire city of Lynchburg, Bedford County, and Campbell County. This seat has two incumbents following redistricting: Republican Stephen Newman, who was first elected in 1995, and Republican Mark Peake, who was first elected in 2017.

Republican Primary

Potential
 Mark Peake, incumbent

Declined
 Stephen Newman, incumbent

District 9
Senate District 9 contains the entire city of Danville, Charlotte County, Halifax County, Lunenburg County, Mecklenburg County, Nottoway County, and Pittsylvania County, as well as portions of Prince Edward County. The incumbent is Republican Frank Ruff, who was first elected in 2000.

Republican Primary

Potential
 Frank Ruff, incumbent

Democratic Primary

Declared
 Trudy Berry, U.S. Air Force veteran and nominee for HD-61 in 2019 and 2021

District 10
Senate District 10 contains all of Amelia County, Appomattox County, Buckingham County, Cumberland County, Fluvanna County, Goochland County, and Powhatan County, as well as portions of Hanover County, Louisa County and Prince Edward County. This is an open seat following redistricting.

Republican Primary

Declared
 Duane Adams, Louisa County supervisor
 Sandy Brindley, community activist
 Jack Dyer, businessman
 John McGuire, state delegate

Democratic Priamry

Potential
 Jacob Boykin, university student

District 11
Senate District 11 contains the entire city of Charlottesville, Albemarle County, Amherst County, and Nelson County, as well as portions of Louisa County. The incumbent is Democrat Creigh Deeds, who was first elected in 2001.

Democratic Primary

Declared
 Creigh Deeds, incumbent
 Sally Hudson, state delegate

Republican Primary

Potential
 Philip Hamilton, activist and nominee for HD-57 in 2021

Independents

Declared
 J'riah Guerrero, public transit employee

District 12
Senate District 12 contains the entire city of Colonial Heights, as well as portions of Chesterfield County. The incumbent is non-caucusing Republican Amanda Chase, who was first elected in 2015.

Republican Primary

Declared
 Amanda Chase, incumbent
 Tina Ramirez, founder of the International Religious Freedom Caucus and candidate for VA-7 in 2020 and 2022
 Glen Sturtevant, former senator

District 13
Senate District 13 contains the entire cities of Hopewell, Petersburg, Charles City County, Prince George County, Surry County, and Sussex County, as well as portions of Dinwiddie County and Henrico County. The incumbent is Democrat Joe Morrissey, who was first elected in 2019.

Declared 
 Lashrecse Aird, former state delegate

Potential 
 Angela Rowe, retired bank executive
 Joe Morrissey, incumbent

Republican Primary

Potential
 Eric Ditri

District 14
Senate District 14 contains portions of the city of Richmond and Henrico County. There is currently no incumbent as Democrat Jennifer McClellan, who was first elected in 2017, was elected to the U.S. House in February 2023.

Democratic Primary

Declined 
 Jennifer McClellan, incumbent (elected to U.S. House in February 2023)

District 15
Senate District 15 contains portions of the city of Richmond and Chesterfield County. The incumbent is Democrat Ghazala Hashmi, who was first elected in 2019.

Democratic Primary

Declared
 Ghazala Hashmi, incumbent

District 16
Senate District 16 contains portions of Henrico County. The incumbent is Republican Siobhan Dunnavant, who was first elected in 2015.

Republican Primary

Potential
 Siobhan Dunnavant, incumbent

Democratic Primary

Declared
 Schuyler VanValkenburg, state delegate

District 17
Senate District 17 contains the entire cities of Emporia, Franklin, Suffolk, Brunswick County, Greensville County, Isle of Wight County, and Southampton County, as well as portions of the city of Portsmouth and Dinwiddie County. This is an open seat following redistricting.

Democratic Primary

Declared
 Clint Jenkins, state delegate

Republican Primary

Declared
 Emily Brewer, state delegate
 Hermie Sadler, former NASCAR driver

District 18
Senate District 18 contains portions of the cities of Chesapeake and Portsmouth. This district has two incumbents following redistricting: Democrat Louise Lucas, who was first elected in 1991, and Democrat Lionell Spruill, who was first elected in 2016.

Democratic Primary

Declared
 Louise Lucas, incumbent
 Lionell Spruill, incumbent

Republican Primary

Declared
 Merle Rutledge, activist

District 19
Senate District 19 contains portions of the cities of Chesapeake and Virginia Beach. The incumbent is Republican John Cosgrove, who was first elected in 2013.

Republican Primary

Declined
 John Cosgrove, incumbent.

Democratic Primary

Potential
 Myra Payne

District 20
Senate District 20 contains all of Accomack County and Northampton County, as well as portions of the cities of Norfolk and Virginia Beach. This district has two incumbents following redistricting: Democrat Lynwood Lewis, who was first elected in 2014, and Republican Bill DeSteph, who was first elected in 2015.

Democratic Primary

Potential
 Victoria Luevanos, U.S. Navy veteran

Declined
 Lynwood Lewis, incumbent

Republican Primary

Potential
 Bill DeSteph, incumbent

District 21
Senate District 21 contains portions of the city of Norfolk. This is an open seat following redistricting.

Democratic Primary

Declared
 Andria McClellan, Norfolk city councilor and candidate for Lieutenant Governor in 2021
 Angelia Williams Graves, state delegate

Withdrawn
 Mike Pudhorodsky, activist

District 22
Senate District 22 contains portions of Virginia Beach. The incumbent is Democrat Aaron Rouse, who was first elected on January 10, 2023, in a special election triggered by the resignation of the previous incumbent, Jen Kiggans, who resigned this seat after winning her election to Virginia's 2nd congressional district in the 2022 election, defeating incumbent Elaine Luria.

Democratic Primary

Declared
 Aaron Rouse, incumbent

District 23
Senate District 23 contains the entire city of Hampton, as well as portions of the city of Newport News. The incumbent is Democrat Mamie Locke, who was first elected in 2003.

Democratic Primary

Potential
 Mamie Locke, incumbent

District 24
Senate District 24 contains the entire cities of Poquoson, Williamsburg, and York County, as well as portions of the city of Newport News and James City County. The incumbent is Democrat Monty Mason, who was first elected in 2016.

Democratic Primary

Potential
 Monty Mason, incumbent

Republican Primary

Declared
 Danny Diggs, York-Poquoson Sheriff

District 25
Senate District 25 contains all of Caroline County, Essex County, King George County, King William County, Lancaster County, Middlesex County, Northumberland County, Richmond County, and Westmoreland County, as well as portions of King & Queen County and Spotsylvania County. The incumbent is Republican Richard Stuart, who was first elected in 2007.

Republican Primary

Declared
 Richard Stuart, incumbent

District 26
Senate District 26 contains all of Gloucester County, Mathews County, and New Kent County, as well as portions of Hanover County, James City County, and King & Queen County. This district has two incumbents following redistricting: Republican Ryan McDougle, who was first elected in 2006, and Republican Tommy Norment, who was first elected in 1991.

Republican Primary

Potential
 Ryan McDougle, incumbent

Declined
 Tommy Norment, incumbent

District 27
Senate District 27 contains the entire city of Fredericksburg, as well as portions of Spotsylvania County and Stafford County. This is an open seat following redistricting.

Democratic Primary

Declared
 Ben Litchfield, attorney

Potential
 Luke Wright, U.S. Marine Corps veteran

Republican Primary

Declared
 Tara Durant, state delegate
 Matt Strickland, restaurant owner

Independents

Decalared
 Monica Gary, Stafford County supervisor

District 28
Senate District 28 contains all of Culpeper County, Greene County, Madison County, Orange County, and Rappahannock County, as well as portions of Fauquier County and Spotsylvania County. The incumbent is Bryce Reeves, who was first elected in 2011.

Republican Primary

Declared
 Mike Allers, teacher
 Bryce Reeves, incumbent

District 29
Senate District 29 contains portions of Prince William County and Stafford County. The incumbent is Democrat Jeremy McPike, who was first elected in 2015.

Democratic Primary

Declared
 Elizabeth Guzmán, state delegate

Potential
 Jeremy McPike, incumbent

Republican Primary

Potential
Nikki Baldwin

District 30
Senate District 30 contains all of the cities of Manassas and Manassas Park, as well as portions of Prince William County. This is an open seat following redistricting.

Democratic Primary

Declared
 Danica Roem, state delegate

Republican Primary

Withdrawn
 Ian Lovejoy, former Manassas City Councilor and nominee for HD-50 in 2019 (running for House of Delegates)

District 31
Senate District 31 contains portions of Fauquier County and Loudoun County. The incumbent is Republican Jill Vogel, who was first elected in 2007.

Republican Primary

Declared
 Juan Pablo Segura, entrepreneur

Withdrawn
Geary Higgins, former Loudoun County supervisor and nominee for SD-13 in 2019

Declined
 Jill Vogel, incumbent

Democratic Primary

Declared
 Zach Cummings, Leesburg town councilor
 Russet Perry, attorney

District 32
Senate District 32 contains portions of Loudoun County. The incumbent is Democrat John Bell, who was first elected in 2019.

Democratic Primary

Declared
 Ibraheem Samirah, former state delegate
 Suhas Subramanyam, state delegate

Declined
 John Bell, incumbent

Republican Primary

Declared
 Greg Moulthrop, tech entrepreneur and nominee for HD-87 in 2021

District 33
Senate District 33 contains portions of Fairfax County and Prince William County. This is an open seat following redistricting.

Democratic Primary

Declared
 Hala Ayala, former state delegate and nominee for Lieutenant Governor in 2021
 Jennifer Carroll Foy, former state delegate and candidate for Governor in 2021

Republican Primary

Declared
 Michael Van Meter, U.S. Navy veteran

District 34
Senate District 34 contains portions of Fairfax County. The incumbent is Democrat Scott Surovell, who was first elected in 2015.

Democratic Primary

Potential
 Scott Surovell, incumbent

District 35
Senate District 35 contains portions of Fairfax County. This district has two incumbents following redistricting: Democrat David W. Marsden, who was first elected in 2010, and Democrat Dick Saslaw, who was first elected in 1980.

Democratic Primary

Declared
 Heidi Drauschak, public advocate

Potential
 David W. Marsden, incumbent

Declined
 Dick Saslaw, incumbent

District 36
Senate District 36 contains portions of Fairfax County. The incumbent is Democrat George Barker, who was first elected in 2007.

Democratic Primary

Declared
 Stella Pekarsky, Fairfax County school board member

Potential
 George Barker, incumbent

District 37
Senate District 37 contains the entire cities of Falls Church and Fairfax, as well as portions of Fairfax County. The incumbent is Democrat Chap Petersen, who was first elected in 2007.

Democratic Primary

Declared
 Saddam Salim, political consultant

Potential
 Chap Petersen, incumbent

District 38
Senate District 38 contains portions of Fairfax County. This district has two incumbents following redistricting: Democrat Jennifer Boysko, who was first elected in 2019, and Democrat Janet Howell, who was first elected in 1991.

Democratic Primary

Potential
 Jennifer Boysko, incumbent

Declined
 Janet Howell, incumbent

Republican Primary

Potential
 Matthew Lang, U.S. Navy veteran and nominee for HD-36 in 2021

District 39
Senate District 39 contains the entire city of Alexandria, as well as portions of Arlington County and Fairfax County. The incumbent is Democrat Adam Ebbin, who was first elected in 2011.

Democratic Primary

Declared
 James DeVita, attorney
 Adam Ebbin, incumbent

District 40
Senate District 40 contains portions of Arlington County. The incumbent is Democrat Barbara Favola, who was first elected in 2011.

Democratic Primary

Declared
 Barbara Favola, incumbent

See also 
 2023 United States state legislative elections

Notes

References 

Virginia Senate
Senate
Virginia Senate elections